Enzo Del Forno (born 24 January 1950) is a retired Italian high jumper who won three medals at the International athletics competitions.

Biography
Del Forno finished tenth at the 1972 Olympic Games and fifth at the 1974 European Indoor Championships. He then won a silver medal at the 1975 Mediterranean Games. At the Summer Universiade he won a bronze medal in 1973 and a gold in 1975.

Nationally Del Forno won five high jump titles, three outdoors (1973–1975) and two indoors (1973, 1974). His personal best jump is 2.22 metres, achieved in October 1975 in Siracusa.

Olympic results

See also
 Men's high jump Italian record progression

References

External links
 

1950 births
Living people
Italian male high jumpers
Athletes (track and field) at the 1972 Summer Olympics
Olympic athletes of Italy
Mediterranean Games silver medalists for Italy
Athletes (track and field) at the 1975 Mediterranean Games
Universiade medalists in athletics (track and field)
Mediterranean Games medalists in athletics
Universiade gold medalists for Italy
Universiade bronze medalists for Italy
Medalists at the 1973 Summer Universiade